The 2006 PGA Championship was the 88th PGA Championship, played August 17–20 at Medinah Country Club in Medinah, Illinois, a suburb northwest of Chicago. Tiger Woods won his third PGA Championship and twelfth major title, five shots ahead of runner-up Shaun Micheel, the 2003 champion. It was consecutive major wins for Woods, after taking The Open Championship at Hoylake four weeks earlier.

The No. 3 Course was the longest to date in major championship history. Medinah previously hosted the tournament in 1999, when Woods captured his first PGA Championship. The purse was $6.8 million with a winner's share of $1.224 million.

This was the last appearance for two-time winner Nick Price.

Field
All former PGA Champions 
Winners of the last five U.S. Opens (2002-2006) 
Winners of the last five Masters (2002-2006) 
Winners of the last five British Opens (2002-2006) 
The 2006 Senior PGA Champion 
The low 15 scorers and ties in The 2005 PGA Championship 
The 20 low scorers in The 2006 PGA Professional National Championship 
The 70 leaders in official money standings from the 2005 International through the 2006 Buick Open 
Members of the 2004 United States Ryder Cup Team 
Winners of tournaments co-sponsored or approved by the PGA Tour and designated as official events from The 2005 PGA Championship to The 2006 PGA Championship. (Does not include pro-am or team competitions). 
In addition, The PGA of America reserves the right to invite additional players not included in the categories above. 
The 156-player field will be filled (in order) by those players below 70th place in official money standings from the 2005 International through the 2006 Buick Open.

Full eligibility list

Course layout

No. 3 Course

Previous course lengths for major championships:
 , par 72 - 1999 PGA Championship
 , par 72 - 1990 U.S. Open
 , par 71 - 1975 U.S. Open
 , par 71 - 1949 U.S. Open

Round summaries

First round 
Thursday, August 17, 2006

Chris Riley and Lucas Glover set the pace in round one shooting six under 66s. Tiger Woods finished the round at 69, three shots off the pace. Defending champion Phil Mickelson also shot 69. Mark Calcavecchia and Dudley Hart withdrew from the tournament.

Second round
Friday, August 18, 2006

Four players shared the lead at the conclusion of the second round, including Tim Herron, Billy Andrade, Luke Donald and Henrik Stenson. Twenty-four players were within four strokes of the lead including Tiger Woods who shot a bogey free 68 to put himself within one shot of the leaders. Seventy players survived the 36-hole cut of even-par 144. Big names that missed the cut included: Vijay Singh, John Daly, Fred Couples, and Colin Montgomerie.

Third round 
Saturday, August 19, 2006

Tiger Woods matched the course record with a 7-under 65, giving him a share of the lead with Luke Donald. Mike Weir also shot 65 to sit alone in third, two shots behind the leaders. It was last done by Per-Ulrik Johansson at Riviera in 1995; the first was by club pro Darrell Kestner at Inverness in 1993.

Final round 
Sunday, August 20, 2006

Tiger Woods moved to 12-0 in majors where he led or shared the lead after 54 holes. He bested the field by five shots to win his third PGA Championship and 12th major. Third round co-leader Luke Donald shot a two-over 74 and fell out of contention on the back nine. 2003 champion Shaun Micheel shot 69 to finish in second outright. Tiger Woods tied his record for the aggregate low score in PGA Championship history (shared with Bob May at Valhalla in 2000) at 18 strokes under-par. He also became the first ever to win the PGA twice on the same course, and the first in the era of the modern Grand Slam to win two major championships in each of two successive years. Chad Campbell shot the low round of the day, a six-under 66, to finish in a tie for 24th.

Source:

Scorecard
Final round

Cumulative tournament scores, relative to par

Source:

References

External links
2006 PGA Championship official site
Coverage on European Tour's official site
Medinah Country Club official site

PGA Championship
Golf in Illinois
Medinah, Illinois
PGA Championship
PGA Championship
PGA Championship